The Ottoman and Turkish Studies Association (formerly the Turkish Studies Association) is a learned society established in 1971 for the promotion of Turkish and Ottoman studies.  It was previously known as the Turkish Studies Group. It publishes the Journal of the Ottoman and Turkish Studies Association (formerly Turkish Studies Association Journal, earlier Turkish Studies Association Bulletin).

Presidents 
Past presidents of the organisation include:

References 

Organizations established in 1971
Turkology
Ottoman studies